The 1998 Nike Tour season was the eighth season of the Nike Tour, the PGA Tour's official developmental tour, now known as the Korn Ferry Tour. The top fifteen players on the final money list earned PGA Tour cards for 1999.

Schedule
The following table lists official events during the 1998 season.

Money leaders
For full rankings, see 1998 Nike Tour graduates.

The money list was based on prize money won during the season, calculated in U.S. dollars. The top 15 players on the tour earned status to play on the 1999 PGA Tour.

Awards

Notes

References

Korn Ferry Tour seasons
Nike Tour